Moruya is a town located on the far south coast of New South Wales, Australia, situated on the Moruya River. Its built up area had a population of 2,762. The town relies predominantly on agriculture, aquaculture, and tourism. Moruya is administered by the Eurobodalla Shire Council and the shire chambers are located in the town.

Rural areas around Moruya were affected by the 2019–20 Australian bushfire season.

History

The South Coast region of New South Wales is the traditional home of the Yuin people, with the area in and around Moruya home to the Bugelli-Manji clan.

The name "Moruya" is derived from an Aboriginal Tharawal word believed to mean "home of the black swan", although this is not probable and not verifiable. Black swans can be seen in the lakes and rivers around Moruya, and the black swan is used locally as an emblem.

European settlement commenced in the 1820s following the extension of the limits of location in 1829, although the coast from Batemans Bay to Moruya was surveyed the previous year by surveyor Thomas Florance. In 1830, the next settler, John Hawdon, set up a squat at Bergalia, but being beyond the limits, could not gain title to the land. In 1831, though, he was granted land on the north bank of the river, upstream from Flanagan. He called the property Kiora and it also occupied 4 sq mi. A village named after the property soon grew.

In 1835, across the river from Flanagan, William Morris squatted a block he called Gundary. William Campbell took up as a manager there and eventually bought the place himself in 1845. The town centre was surveyed in 1850 by surveyor Parkinson and the town was gazetted in 1851. It centred about the track opposite where the road from Broulee terminated at the river bank, the two being linked by a punt. As a blacksmith was on that track, it was named Vulcan Street. Campbell Street owed its name to the squatter, Queen Street to patriotism, and Church Street to the Catholic Church's presence there. Land sales commenced in 1852.
 
Moruya was proclaimed a municipality in 1891. Local industries were timber logging, gold mining, dairying, and quarrying for granite. The first bridge across the Moruya River was erected in 1876, though frequent flooding caused new bridges to be erected in 1900, 1945, and most recently in 1966.

During World War II, Moruya aerodrome was used as an advanced operational base. The trawler Dureenbee was attacked offshore between Moruya and Batemans Bay by a Japanese submarine on 3 August 1942. On 25 December 1944, the US liberty ship USS Robert J. Walker was torpedoed off Moruya by the German submarine U-862, sinking the next day between Moruya and Bega. Casualties were two dead, with 67 survivors.

Heritage listings 
Moruya has a number of heritage-listed sites, including:
 Moruya and District Historical Society, 85 Campbell Street: Abernethy and Co Stonemason's Lathe
 13 Page Street: Moruya Mechanics' Institute

Moruya granite
Moruya is known for its granite stone that was used to build significant Australian landmarks, including the Sydney Harbour Bridge. The granite used in the Harbour Bridge pylons was quarried in the area. The proximity of the quarries to the water meant it could be easily transported to Sydney. Quarrying for granite commenced in the district in the late 1850s by brothers Joseph and John Flett Louttit, who were from the Orkney Islands. Their quarry on the south side of the river produced stone for many Sydney landmarks, including the columns of the General Post Office in Martin Place, and the base of the Captain Cook statue in Hyde Park.

The Moruya Quarry, also known as the Government Quarry, opened in 1876 on the northern bank of the Moruya River. From 1925 to 1932, the Harbour Bridge works had 250 stonemasons employed and relocated to Moruya by the contractor to produce  of dimension stone for the bridge pylons, 173,000 blocks, and 200,000 yards of crushed stone that was used as aggregate for concrete. Moruya granite was also used for the Sydney Cenotaph in Martin Place. During the seven years of this work, a small town of about 70 houses grew up near the quarry called Granitetown; little remains of the town today. The quarry had a tramway that closed in 1931. The wharf that was used by the quarry stood until around 2008, but was pulled down and replaced by a fishing platform. 

The Moruya Quarry is operated by the New South Wales Department of Infrastructure, Planning, and Natural Resources. A third quarry west of the Moruya Quarry was operated by the Ziegler family.

Retail 

Moruya has various retailers, banks, and services located on the high street, whilst supermarkets are located on the side streets. Harris Scarfe has a store in the town, it being a former branch of Goulburn retailer Allen's. Moruya has two supermarkets; one is a 10-aisle Woolworths (opened in 2000) and an IGA (opened in 2013). The former eight-aisle Franklins, which opened on 28 June 2011, ceased trading in February 2013. 

Moruya is also home to the regional telecommunications company, Southern Phone. The Tuesday afternoon and Saturday markets and fruit and vegetable markets are popular with local people and visitors.

Landmarks
Moruya Airport (code MYA) is located on the north side of Moruya Heads. The strip adjoins the beachfront, and flights to Moruya offer a slow and picturesque descent along the coastline. Regional Express  flies mostly Saab 340B aircraft from Moruya to Sydney and Moruya to Merimbula, with connecting flights to Melbourne.

Climate
Moruya has a mild oceanic climate (Cfb) with warm, somewhat humid summers and cool, moderately drier winters. The drier winters are owed to the foehn effect from the Great Dividing Range, which blocks rainfall from the westerly cold fronts that arrive from the Southern Ocean. The city features 136 clear days, with August being the sunniest month and February the cloudiest.

Notable residents
 Sarah Andrewsformer cricket player; represented Australia
 Mike Balzary a.k.a. Fleamusician and lead singer with the Red Hot Chili Peppers; has a property in Congo, 8 km south-east of Moruya
 Josh Cunninghammusician with The Waifs
 Charles Harpurpoet; a former goldfields commissioner in the Eurobodalla area; a farmer at Eurobodalla
 Jarrad Kennedyformer rugby league football player 
 Norm Ryanpolitician; represented Labor
 Michael Weymanformer rugby league football player; played with the Kangaroos
 Richie Williamsformer rugby league football player
 Bill Woodstelevision sports presenter
 Stevie Wrightlead vocalist with The Easybeats

See also 
 Moruya High School

References

External links

Sydney Morning Herald travel article about Moruya
South Coast Online: Moruya
Moruya Business Chamber Website
Visit Moruya

Towns in New South Wales
Towns in the South Coast (New South Wales)
Eurobodalla Shire